Whatever's Right was a 1969 album by Lonnie Mack.

Track listing
"Untouched by Human Love" (Norman Simon, Dick Roman) 3:40  
"I Found a Love" (Wilson Pickett, Willie Schofield, Robert West) 3:34  
"Share Your Love With Me" (Deadric Malone, Alfred Braggs) 4:12  
"Teardrops on Your Letter" (S. Scott) 4:14  
"Baby What You Want Me to Do" (Jimmy Reed) 2:53  
"Mt. Healthy Blues" [instrumental] (Mack) 6:50  
"What Kind of World Is This?" (Troy Seals) 4:05  
"My Babe" (Willie Dixon)  2:36  
"Things Have Gone to Pieces" (Leon Payne) 2:55  
"Gotta Be an Answer" (Mack) 2:43

Personnel
Lonnie Mack - guitar, vocals, 6-string bass
Rusty York - harmonica
Bruce Botnick - engineer
Jack Brickles - harmonica
David Byrd - keyboards
Roy Christiansen - cello
Tim Drummond - bass
Ron Grayson - drums
Timothy Hedding - organ
Jac Holzman - production co-ordination
Jerry Love - drums
Denzil "Dumpy" Rice - piano
Leslie Asch, E. Brenden Harkin - horn arrangements
Sherlie Matthews - vocals

Earlier recording
"Untouched By Human Love" was originally released in 1963, by the soul/jazz singer Azie Mortimer on the Troy Records label.

References

1969 albums
Lonnie Mack albums
Elektra Records albums